Scarnecchia is an Italian surname. Notable people with the surname include:

Dante Scarnecchia (born 1948), American football player and coach
Roberto Scarnecchia (born 1958), Italian footballer and manager
Suellyn Scarnecchia, American legal scholar
Orlando Carmelo Scarnecchia, aka John Scarne (1903-1985), American magician and card shark.

Italian-language surnames